Los Chiles is a canton in the Alajuela province of Costa Rica.

Toponymy
 translates and refers to bell peppers.

History 
Los Chiles was created on 17 March 1970 by decree 4541.

Geography 
Los Chiles has an area of  km² and a mean elevation of  metres.

The canton lies along the border of Nicaragua at the top of the Llanura de San Carlos (San Carlos Plains) in north central Costa Rica. The Pocosol River forms the southeastern boundary of the canton, with (from north to south) the Rita, Mónico, Frío and the Purgatorio rivers establishing the southwestern border.

Districts 
The canton of Los Chiles is subdivided into the following districts:
 Los Chiles
 Caño Negro
 El Amparo
 San Jorge

Demographics 

For the 2011 census, Los Chiles had a population of  inhabitants.

Transportation

Road transportation 
The canton is covered by the following road routes:

Economy
This is a low-lying, sparsely settled region primarily devoted to large agricultural enterprises.

References 

Cantons of Alajuela Province
Populated places in Alajuela Province